Maine Cabin Masters is a reality television show airing on the Magnolia Network (formerly known as DIY Network) that chronicles the restoration and renovation of cabins in Maine. The show centers on contractor Chase Morrill, his designer sister Ashley Morrill, and her carpenter husband Ryan Eldridge. Also featured in each episode are master carpenters Matt "Dixie" Dix and Jared "Jedi" Baker. It debuted on January 2, 2017, and as of November 2022 is in its eighth season. Over its first three seasons, it was DIY's highest rated program.

Premise
Each episode begins with Chase introducing Ashley and Ryan to a new cabincalled "camps" in the local parlanceand its owners. Typically, the cabins are in poor shape and badly in need of renovation. A budget and deadline are set. The Cabin Masters then make every attempt to restore these structures, remaining true to their original function, but sometimes adding modern amenities like solar panels and composting toilets. At the end of the episode, the Cabin Masters "reveal" the renovated cabin to its owners and ceremoniously hand over its keys.

Chase is the team's leader, but the work is done collaboratively. As the designer, Ashley chooses paint colors and the like, and seeks objects that are unique to Maine culturesuch as tote bags made from old sails.

References

External links
DIY Network Page
Official Website

Home renovation television series
2017 American television series debuts
DIY Network original programming